José Antonio Delgado Villar (born 30 March 1993), known as Nono, is a Spanish professional footballer who plays for Saudi Arabian club Damac FC as a central midfielder.

Club career

Betis
Born in El Puerto de Santa María, Province of Cádiz, Nono joined Real Betis' youth system at the age of 15 after a brief spell with Atlético Madrid. In the 2011–12 season he made his debut as a senior, being a starter with the reserves in the Segunda División B.

Nono made his official debut with the Andalusians' first team on 5 May 2012, playing 74 minutes in a 2–1 La Liga away loss against Sporting de Gijón. He contributed 15 matches and 589 minutes of action in his first full campaign, helping the side finish seventh and qualify for the UEFA Europa League.

Nono subsequently helped Betis reach the Europa League's round of 16. He scored once in seven appearances, in the 2–0 away win over FC Rubin Kazan on 27 February 2014; in the next stage, however, he missed a penalty in the shootout against fellow Spaniards Sevilla FC, who went through 4–3.

Elche, UCAM and Hungary
On 2 February 2015, looking for more playing time, Nono was loaned to 2. Bundesliga's SV Sandhausen until June. On 17 July, after making no competitive appearances for the Germans, he terminated his contract with Betis and moved to Elche CF from Segunda División on 11 August. 

On 1 February 2016, Nono returned to the third tier after being loaned to UCAM Murcia CF. In the ensuing summer, he moved abroad again and signed with Hungarian club Diósgyőri VTK, where he shared teams with compatriot Diego Vela.

Slovan Bratislava
In February 2018, Nono joined ŠK Slovan Bratislava on a four-and-a-half-year deal. During his spell in Slovakia, he won three Super Liga championships and as many domestic cups.

Later career
Nono started 2021–22 again in the Hungarian Nemzeti Bajnokság I, with Budapest Honvéd FC. On 31 January 2022 he switched countries again, agreeing to a one-and-a-half-year contract at Damac FC of the Saudi Professional League.

Career statistics

Honours
Betis
Segunda División: 2014–15

UCAM Murcia
Segunda División B: 2015–16

Slovan Bratislava
Slovak Super Liga: 2018–19, 2019–20, 2020–21
Slovak Cup: 2017–18, 2019–20, 2020–21

Spain U19
UEFA European Under-19 Championship: 2012

References

External links

1993 births
Living people
People from El Puerto de Santa María
Sportspeople from the Province of Cádiz
Spanish footballers
Footballers from Andalusia
Association football midfielders
La Liga players
Segunda División players
Segunda División B players
Betis Deportivo Balompié footballers
Real Betis players
Elche CF players
UCAM Murcia CF players
SV Sandhausen players
Nemzeti Bajnokság I players
Diósgyőri VTK players
Budapest Honvéd FC players
Slovak Super Liga players
ŠK Slovan Bratislava players
Saudi Professional League players
Damac FC players
Spain youth international footballers
Spanish expatriate footballers
Expatriate footballers in Germany
Expatriate footballers in Hungary
Expatriate footballers in Saudi Arabia
Expatriate footballers in Slovakia
Spanish expatriate sportspeople in Germany
Spanish expatriate sportspeople in Hungary
Spanish expatriate sportspeople in Saudi Arabia
Spanish expatriate sportspeople in Slovakia